A tech union is a trade union for tech workers typically employed in high tech or information, community, technology services sectors. Due to the evolving nature of technology and work, different government agencies have conflicting definitions for who is a tech worker. Most definitions include computer scientists, people working in IT, telecommunications, media and video gaming. Broader definitions include all workers required for a tech company to operate, including on-site service staff, contractors, and platform economy workers.

Global 
UNI Global Union is an international union federation that has an Information, Communications, Technology and Related Services (ICTS) sector. UNI Global Union was involved in the organizing of Romanian IT and outsourcing firms.

In 2021, UNI Global Union and international workers for Alphabet, Google's parent company, announced an international union coalition called Alpha Global to assist in organizing the company's global workforce.

Australia 
Professionals Australia is the union that represents Australian tech workers.

France 
Solidaires Informatique is a union that includes game workers and filed a lawsuit against game developer Ubisoft in 2021.

Ireland 
The Financial Services Union (FSU) has produced surveys, research, and legislative action around the IT, tech, and financial tech sectors as early as 2019.

Israel 
Cellular, Internet and High-Tech was founded in 2014 as an affiliate of the Israeli trade union confederation Histadrut. It represents 3,000 workers through the collective bargaining agreement it has with 6 high-tech firms including the Israel divisions of SAP and Visonic. A further 200 employees of Surecomp are organized through the other Israeli federation, Koach LaOvdim.

People's Republic of China

Mainland China 
The All-China Federation of Trade Unions is officially the only trade union in China and acts as an extension of the state's interests. It either co-opts or restricts independent labour organising. Most trade union chairs in China are company managers, party cadre members and appointed, rather than elected. Foxconn union was formed in November 2006. It represents 90 percent of Foxconn's 1.4 million workers in China and is a company union dominated by management. However, since 2010, due to increased labour militancy and strikes, workers through China have been able to demand more worker representation in union elections.

In 2018 Jasic Technology retaliated against a worker led union drive. Over 100 students and workers were arrested including members of Jasic Workers Solidarity Group in what became known as the Jasic incident.

In March 2019, Chinese tech workers mobilized, after an anonymous person uploaded a repository named 996.icu to GitHub. 996 refers to 9AM to 9PM, 6 days a week or 72 hour work cycle. Over 230,000 tech workers, mainly in China 'starred' or 'liked' the repository, making it one of the largest tech actions in China. US based Microsoft (which own GitHub) employees signed a letter in support of the 996 movement, opposing censorship.

Hong Kong 
In the context of the pro-democracy 2019 protests, tech workers founded the Hong Kong Information Technology Workers' Union and developed a database of sympathetic employers who are supportive of the protests. The union was later dissolved due to widespread state repression in Hong Kong following the protests.

Philippines 
The Business Process Outsourcing Industry Employee's Network (BIEN), historically organized call center workers and more recently has focused on organizing tech industry contract workers. In 2021, the union's president had to move into hiding after increased government surveillance and right-wing targeting of left and labor organizers and organizations in the country. BIEN has a long history of organizing in solidarity with US and Canada tech, media, and telecommunications union Communications Workers of America (CWA), including an incident in 2016 where BIEN and CWA organizers were held at gunpoint by an armed right-wing militia during an organizing effort.

Romania 
Sindicatul IT Timișoara (Romanian IT Union) represents 3,000 IT and outsourcing workers at Alcatel-Lucent, Wipro, Accenture and Alto since 2009.

Serbia 
The Association of Internet Workers is a trade union of internet-based platform workers in Serbia.

South Korea 
IT, tech, and game worker unionization is a recent trend, located primarily in the Pangyo Techno Valley with a first wave of organization in 2018 and a second in 2021.

In September 2018, over 300 workers at video-game developer Nexon formed the country's first game worker union across the company's affiliates such as Nexon Networks Corp., Neople and Nexon Red. In 2019 over 600 members took collective action around reorganizations, job security, and other issues at Nexon. The union, known as Starting Point, successfully won significant pay raises for members in 2020.

In 2018 workers at South Korean game company Smilegate also formed a labor union known as SG Guild and successfully got Smilegate executives to sign an agreement with the employees. The union held a demonstration in 2019 calling for "stable work practices".

In March 2021 workers at Kakao's online-only bank firm KakaoBank formed a union. In April 2021, workers at Webzen, an online game developer, established a union. As of 2021 there are also unions at IT, financial tech, and game firms AhnLab, Hangul & Computer, XL Games, and Naver.

Sweden 
Swedish unions Unionen and Saco signed a collective bargaining agreement with strategy game developer Paradox Interactive that covers all 200 of Paradox's workers in Sweden.

Switzerland 
The Swiss union syndicom covers the IT sector and is part of UNI Global Union. It is active within Google among other companies.

In October 2019 employees of Google Switzerland invited syndicom to their office while Google management attempted to shut down their talk.

In February and March 2023 employees of Google Switzerland supported by syndicom walked out to protest layoffs.

United Kingdom 
The first dedicated union branch for tech workers was launched by members of London chapter of Tech Workers Coalition. The branch is called United Tech and Allied Workers and is affiliated with Communication Workers Union. In 2018, the British chapter of Game Workers Unite became a legally recognised union with the IWGB for all video game workers.

United States 
Tech unionization is historically relatively new in the United States, with the exception of telecommunications, primarily organized with the Communications Workers of America. The overall private job sector has a historically low union density rate of 7 percent, with the tech industry being even lower than that.

From 1974 to 1983, the United Electrical (UE) formed a Silicon Valley Electronics Organizing Committee (EOC), which was made up of 1 full time staffer and a dedicated network of rank and file from National Semiconductor, Siltec, Fairchild, Siliconix, Semimetals, and others. They had a newsletter called "The Union Voice" in three languages English, Spanish and Tagalog.

Between 1970 and 2016, a patchwork of IBM worker initiatives formed including the National Black Workers Alliance, IBM Workers United and Alliance@IBM.

From 2014 to 2020, various Amazon worker initiatives have unsuccessfully sought union recognition in different Amazon warehouses, most recently in Bessemer, Alabama. In 2021, members of Teamsters voted at a convention to form an 'Amazon division' to make it a strategic priority.

Unionization has picked up speed since 2019 as several unions have successfully launched initiatives to organize tech workers, such as the Communications Workers of America, United Steel Workers and Office and Professional Employees International Union.

National Unions Actively Organizing in Tech 
In September 2019, the United Steel Workers organized HCL workers who were sub contractors for Google Pittsburgh and subsequently launched.

In January 2020, the Communications Workers of America launched the Campaign to Organize Digital Employees (CODE-CWA) to organize tech, game, and digital workers in the US and Canada. According to the CODE-CWA website "thousands of tech, game, and digital workers" have organized with over a dozen CODE-CWA organizing campaigns, including several certified unions with collective bargaining rights. As of August 2022, CODE-CWA has organized over 3000 union members in various sub-industries of the tech sector across over 25 bargaining units in the last two years of organizing.

Within its first year the CODE-CWA campaign unionized workers at Glitch, Blue State Digital, the Alphabet Workers Union at Alphabet, and game studio Voltage Entertainment. In 2021, workers at Do Better Tech, Mobilize, Medium, NPR, Mapbox, Catalist, Change.org, EveryAction, and New York Times Tech staff launched public unionization drives, with civic tech companies Mobilize, Catalist and Change.org receiving voluntary recognition from their employers. CODE-CWA has also supported workers at Activision Blizzard by filing Unfair Labor Practice charge with the NLRB. CODE-CWA has also organized the first table-top game company at Pathfinder and Starfinder developer Paizo.

In January 2021, Office and Professional Employees International Union (OPEIU) launched Tech Workers Union Local 1010 as a result of its success unionizing Kickstarter. In August, workers at Code for America went public with their union drive with OPEIU.

Recent US Tech Unionization Firsts 
In 2019, workers at HCL with the United Steel Workers were the first to organize an office based tech union.

In 2020, the Communications Workers of America (CWA) were the first to launch a national tech and game union organizing campaign, the Campaign to Organize Digital Employees (CODE-CWA). The CODE-CWA campaign has since organized the first successful strike in the game sector of the tech industry at Voltage Entertainment, the first table-top game company at Pathfinder and Starfinder developer Paizo, the first voluntary union recognition in the US tech industry at Glitch, the first ratified collective bargaining agreement at Glitch, the first worker-owned cooperative in the tech industry at Do Better Tech, and the first mass-voluntary membership union at a major modern tech company at Alphabet.

In the summer of 2022, Microsoft and CWA jointly announced that they had signed what many deemed to be a union neutrality agreement.

Recent US Tech Worker Unions and Union-Organization by Company

See also 

 CODE-CWA
Communications Workers of America
Alphabet Workers Union
Amazon worker organization
Apple worker organization
IBM worker organization
Google worker organization
Game Workers Unite
SAP employee representation
Tech Workers Coalition
Tesla and unions

References

External links 
  Official Website
 UNI Global Union Information, Communications, Technology and Services sector Official Website
Collective Actions in Tech Data

Tech sector trade unions
Lists of trade unions